Oblivion: The Black Hole is a roller coaster at Gardaland, close to Lake of Garda. The ride is one of many Dive Coaster models to be manufactured by Swiss roller coaster manufacturer Bolliger & Mabillard. Since its opening, it became the first vertical drop roller coaster in Italy. 
The ride is considered the 'sister' to the iconic Oblivion roller coaster at the also Merlin owned Alton Towers. The ride also (maybe unintentionally) shares part of its name with The Black Hole, a Jet star 2 rollercoaster that operated in the X sector section of Alton towers on the current site of The Smiler.

Marketing
 
The theme and marketing campaign of the ride share many similarities to Oblivion, the world's first vertical drop roller coaster situated at fellow Merlin Entertainments park, Alton Towers. The ride also shares the same 'ultimate rollercoaster' slogan that was used originally for Thirteen also at Alton Towers.

Ride Experience

After climbing to the top of the lift hill, the train begins turning to the left before being suspended over a vertical drop on a holding brake. After a few seconds, the train is released and plummets down the vertical drop into a subterranean tunnel. After levelling out and ascending back out from the tunnel, the train flips through an immelmann and over an airtime hill, before navigating a 270° helix. Proceeding from the helix, the train passes through a heartline roll before entering the brake section and returning to the station.

Queue Line and Station
The queue line features two main sections, the outside compact queue pens and the themed inside queue line. The inside queue line features many different lighting effects also the walls are painted in orange, white and black throughout with images and diagrams that link to the theme of the ride. Before entering the station, the queue line goes over an orange bridge and into the station.

References

External links 

 

Dive Coaster roller coasters
Roller coasters in Italy
Roller coasters operated by Merlin Entertainments
Roller coasters introduced in 2015
Gardaland rides
2015 establishments in Italy